Loon, officially the Municipality of Loon,  is a 2nd class municipality in the province of Bohol, Philippines which was established in 1753. According to the 2020 census, it has a population of 44,224 people.

Loon lies halfway between Tagbilaran and Tubigon, Bohol's major ports of entry, each of which is only 40 minutes away by public utility buses, jeepneys and vans-for-hire that frequently ply the north–south route. Loon has one provincial secondary port and six fishing ports. The secondary port is being converted into the Loon Bohol International Cruise Ship Port. Currently it serves the Loon—Argao (Cebu) route.

Loon was among the hardest hit towns in the 2013 Bohol earthquake. About a third of all casualties occurred in this town, and its church, dating from the 1850s, completely razed to the ground.

Geography

 north of Tagbilaran is the town proper of Loon, the westernmost municipality of the island province. Cabilao and Sandingan islands are part of the municipality. Lanao Lake on Cabilao island (also known as Cabilao Island Lake) is the only natural lake in Bohol province.

Topography

Loon is composed of land mass, coastlines and natural waters and has a relatively rolling topography consisting of moderate hills, rolling plains, sparse plateaus interspersed with valleys, and some ravines.

Climate

Barangays

Loon comprises 67 barangays.
{{PH brgy table lite|top|13=  Etymology}}

 soso  a freshwater shellfish species

badba-an a local shrub or tree

bagakay or bamboo abundant in the area
katipuhan a place where "tipolo" trees grew in abundance
kawayan a bamboo thicket beside a small pool of mud where carabaos wallow
saong a tree species whose sap thought similar to paste used in the making of Noah's Ark

 bahi the hard portion of the trunk of a "pugahan" palm

 basac from the visayan word "basa", which means "wet" and many years passed by, turned into "basac"

 baas means sand
daku means big; wide shoreline of the barangay
diyo means small; a patch of sand on its shoreline

 biasong: a variety of orange grown near the Moalong River

 trabongko: a legendary shining ball that giant snakes amused at night

 bugho or hole, references to the ravines and gorges of the barangay

 after the plant bakong

 land purportedly belonging (Ca) to the first inhabitant named Badug

 kabug bats hanging from the branches of "tipolo" trees

 after the swaying coconut trees which looked like fighting (galayug)

 bas nga nag-ekis-ekis or sand that crosses from one side to other depending on the waves. (A popular yet wrong tale means "come back and kiss".)

 patud a spring in a thick forest where hunters go

 legendary ever-burning stump of dead tree to kindle (daig) lamps

 kanhangdon root word is "hangad" or to look up from the Moalong River

 nigaran a legendary place where big niga trees grew

 mamag or tarsier, which were plentiful

 manok where wild chickens abound

 after a spring of the same name

 subayon the act of walking the banks of creeks

 tam-is means sweet
 bago is a vegetable
 baslay the name of a spring

 taongon tree was abundant

 sondo a creek where one needs to take a leap (tukad)

 tagbak means to barter or exchange goods
 katagbacan is a location where barter takes place
 handig a location on slopes that rise from the plain

 kogon grass

 "Kawasi!", an order to disembark or jump overboard (to save the cargo)

 the legend says an ill farmer called out because his carabao was hinomolan (wallowing in the river)

 tuwang-tuwang, the changing movement of sand blown by south and north winds

 the curved shape of its coastline na lo-ok

 pok-pok, the warning drum hung from a mangrove tree (pagatpat) when Moros pirate kumpits were coming

 moto or hill, located above the original settlement, the coastal barangay of Napo

 nagatuwang whereby flow of water from a spring is absorbed higher

 napolo or napoo means place formed from sand

 Spanish for 'new life'; the new settlement built when Catagbacan became too big

 panankilon, a medicinal herb

 from tulod-tulod the thrusting action of the waves shifting sand by the wind blow

 pi-ot the narrow stretch of road which widened by blasting, resulting in the fleeing of the monkeys from their habitat

 pundo-pundo or pondol juts into the sea or pools of water

 kinubkoban holes dug looking for sources of water.

 sondol or donsol, a sea slug species abundant in its seashore

 so-ongon, an arch-like rock formation along the shoreline; where one has to stoop (so-ong) to pass

 talisay trees which growing on cliffs over the shoreline

 tan-awan means a place where one gets a good view of the villages below it

 tangnan is cave that contains fresh water

 taytay a bridge, narrow hilltop-located pathway that leads to the center of the village

 tikog plant whose leaf strips can be woven into mats

 tiwi the trees that once grew on the eastern part

 tontonan means to use a rope (tonton) to scale a high mountain

 tubod means spring
daku means big
diyo means small

 tuburan is a spring

 nag-ubay sa baybayon means straddling the shoreline

 ulbohan a well where water gushed in spurts (ga ulbo-ulbo)

Demographics

Economy

Gross Annual Income (2014): ₱63.2 million

Major industries: agriculture, fishery, cottage (ready-to-wear clothes, mats, baskets), transportation, trading, tourism

Loon's public markets include two main public markets and five barangay/feeder markets. There are more than 800 business establishments and entrepreneurs in Loon.

Indigenous culture and crafts

 Processing of "binago", grated and dried cassava steamed over a perforated coconut half-shell fitted onto the mouth of an earthen pot half-filled with water; common in the barangays on Sandingan and Cabilao islands and in Ubayon.
 Production of "tubâ" or toddy from coconut in Cantaongon and other upland barangays.
 "Drama" or community theater in Napo, a fervently sustained local tradition that originated during the Spanish period. Local residents get involved as actors, singers, directors, stage managers and playwrights.
 Weaving of mats from romblon palm in Cabilao; production of nypa shingles near Moalong River; and weaving of baskets and other handicrafts from bamboo, rattan, baliw, nito, sigid, sagisi and other materials in some upland barangays
 Production of corn and cassava on the rocky slopes of Basdio. The "farm-on-the-rocks" is itself a tourist attraction because from below, the crops seem to grow not on soil but on black rocks and boulders.
 Christmas caroling: "Daygon", "Pastores" and "Igiigi"
 Good Friday dawn pilgrimage to Big Cross
 Good Friday procession and Easter "Sugat/Hugos" rites in the town center
 September "Festival of Lights" or "SidlaKasilak" in honor of the town's patroness
 Town fiesta on 8 September and barangay fiestas throughout the year.

Tourism

Heritage and historical sites

 Inang-angan (grand stairway of coral stone blocks, 212 steps): A National Cultural Treasure
 Sombria Bridge: stone bridge with the highest elevation among colonial bridges in the province.
 Napo Ruins: possibly the remnants of a watchtower
 Ferandos House: ancestral house (chalet) built during the American period.
 Gabaldon building: the main building of Loon South Central Elementary School built in 1915.
 Loon Public Plaza
 Big Cross: a pilgrimage site marked by a Big Cross on the slopes Cabug offers a majestic view of the Cebu Strait. A road leading to the place features replicas of the 14 Stations of the Cross.
 Virgen de la Paz Hermitage: home of the Virgen de la Paz hermit nuns that sits on a cliff that overlooking the mangroves and marine sanctuary in Tangnan and offers an unobstructed view of the sea and the blue mountains of Cebu.
 Solar-powered Lighthouse: located in Punta Baluarte in Pantudlan, Cabilao Island, this modern lighthouse is a donation of the Spanish government and stands beside the old one retained for its historical value.
 Punta Baluarte Eco-Museum: a Spanish-era bulwark on Cabilao Island that has been transformed into an eco-cultural museum
 Mesina House: the only remaining ancestral house of such design. With some families experiencing early the economic boom brought about by success in the retail business, mostly in Leyte, Samar, Negros and Mindanao, and in the practice of their professions, all the other old houses have been replaced with modern designs.

‡ Totally destroyed by the 15 October 2013 earthquake.
 Church of Nuestra Señora de la Luz (including old convent): A National Historical Landmark and National Cultural Treasure
 Spanish-Era Mortuary Chapel: A National Cultural Treasure
 Spanish Colonial Cemetery (1800–1860s): A National Cultural Treasure
 Christ the King Monument: an imposing structure on the church plaza that features a figure of the Risen Christ atop a three-sided column at the center of an ornate and multi-layered circular base
 The Grotto: depicts the scene in Lourdes, France where Mary appeared to a girl named Bernadette. It is a favorite backdrop for the annual reenactment of the Last Supper and many other photo opportunities
 Hugosan: a four-column platform serving as main gate of the church; used during Easter Sunday rites

Natural attractions

 Loon Coastal Geomorphic Conservation Park ( intertidal zone uplifted as a result of the 2013 earthquake)
 Loon Macaques: a mainstream tourist destination featuring the crab-eating mangrove monkeys (Cantomocad)
 Cabilao Island
 Dive sites
 Cabilao Island Lake
 Green Footprint Lagoon
 Cabacungan Fish Sanctuary
 Tubig-Loon Spring Park
 White beaches and sand bars (Cabilao and Sandingan Islands)
 Mangrove gardens (Tangnan, Pig-ot, Basdacu, Napo, Cogon Norte, Basac, Tajang Causeway, Sandingan)
 Caves (Cantam-is Baslay and many upland barangays)
 Mount Canmanoc
 Mount Tan-awan: highest point of Loon
 Moalong River and Antaeg Spring and Lagoon
 Piong and Kabantian Falls 
 Danicop Ticugan Springs
 Endemic animals: hammerhead shark, pygmy seahorse, monkeys, exotic birds, "mamag" (tarsier), "kagwang" (a lemur-like gliding mammal), "tinggawong" (bearcat)

Infrastructure

Transportation

Road network:
 national - 
 provincial - 
 municipal - 
 barangay -

Health and safety
 one provincial district hospital (Cong. Natalio P. Castillo, Sr. Memorial Hospital)
 two Rural Health Units
 12 Barangay Health Stations
 one private dental clinic
 three private medical clinics
 one LGU emergency response unit ("Alagad" Center)
 Model Senior Citizens Center
 Lying-in / Birthing Centers, including IMAP Lying-in Center in Calayugan Norte and Catagbacan Norte
 Public security: one PNP station; 704th Regional Public Safety Battalion (Catagbacan Norte)

Utilities

Water is made available to more than 42 barangays principally by the Loon Waterworks System, which has about 3,000 active individual water service connections reaching the northernmost barangay of Pondol, the southernmost barangay of Song-on, all barangays on Sandingan Island, and many hinterland barangays. The rest of the upland barangays are served by Level II communal water systems.

The abundance of water in Loon has also encouraged investors to establish water-refilling stations in the town.

Education

 Public educational institutions: Loon North District - 12 elementary schools; 8 primary schools; 3 secondary schools - Cabilao National High School, Sandingan National High School and Gov. Jacinto Borja National High School (formerly Cantaongon High School)
 Public educational institutions: Loon South District - 10 elementary schools; 9 primary schools; 1 secondary school, Loon South National High School
 Private secondary schools: University of Bohol–Loon Institute, Sacred Heart Academy, Saint Teresa Academy
 Preparatory schools: 64 public preparatory schools (day-care centers); UB Loon Institute Learning Center; Trinitas Learning Center; Saint Teresa Academy Kindergarten School; Catechetical Learning Center (Cuasi)

Notable personalities

Vivoree

References

External links 

 [ Philippine Standard Geographic Code]
Municipality of Loon

Municipalities of Bohol